Akseli Gallen-Kallela (26 April 1865 – 7 March 1931) was a Finnish painter who is best known for his illustrations of the Kalevala, the Finnish national epic. His work is considered a very important aspect of the Finnish national identity. He changed his name from Gallén to Gallen-Kallela in 1907.

Life and career

Early life
Gallen-Kallela was born Axel Waldemar Gallén in Pori, Finland, in a Swedish-speaking family. His father Peter Gallén worked as police chief and lawyer. Gallen-Kallela was raised in Tyrvää. At the age of 11 he was sent to Helsinki to study at a grammar school, because his father opposed his ambition to become a painter. After his father's death in 1879, Gallen-Kallela attended drawing classes at the Finnish Art Society (1881–1884) and studied privately under Adolf von Becker.

Paris

In 1884 he moved to Paris, to study at the Académie Julian. In Paris he became friends with the Finnish painter Albert Edelfelt, the Norwegian painter Carl Dørnberger, and the Swedish writer August Strindberg. During this period he traveled back and forth between Finland and Paris.

Mary Slöör

He married Mary Slöör in 1890. The couple had three children, Impi Marjatta, Kirsti and Jorma. On their honeymoon to East Karelia, Gallen-Kallela started collecting material for his depictions of the Kalevala. This period is characterized by romantic paintings of the Kalevala, such as the Aino Myth, and by several landscape paintings, although by 1894 the influence of symbolism is heavily visible in his works.

Berlin and tragedy

In December 1894, Gallen-Kallela moved to Berlin to oversee the joint exhibition of his works with the works of Norwegian painter Edvard Munch. At the time Gallen-Kallela also designed a grand cabin called Kalela for his family far from everything on the shore of Lake Ruovesi. It was built from dead standing pine by 13 local carpenters in a year from 1894 to 1895.

In March 1895, his trip was ended when he received a telegram that his daughter Impi Marjatta had died from diphtheria. This would prove to be a turning point in his work. While his works had previously been romantic, after his daughter's death Gallen-Kallela painted more aggressive works. In the years 1896–1899 he painted what are considered his most famous works: The Defense of the Sampo, Lemminkäinen's Mother, Joukahainen's Revenge and Kullervo's Curse. In May 1895, Gallen and Mary visited London, with his intent being the purchase of a graphic art press. While there he also learned about stained glass. At the end of 1897 the family took a trip to Florence, also visiting Pompeii, where he studied the art of frescoes.

Paris 1900 Exposition

For the Paris World Fair in 1900, Gallen-Kallela painted frescoes for the Finnish Pavilion. In the fresco Ilmarinen Plowing the Field of Vipers there was a hidden political message: one of the vipers is wearing a small Romanov crown, telling of Gallen-Kallela's wish for an independent Finland at the time of the Russification of Finland.

The Paris Exposition secured Gallen-Kallela's stature as the leading Finnish artist. In 1901 he was commissioned to paint the fresco, Kullervo Sets Off for War, for the concert hall of the Helsinki Student's Union. Between 1901 and 1903 he painted the frescoes for the Jusélius Mausoleum in Pori, memorializing the 11-year-old daughter of the industrialist Fritz Arthur Jusélius. (The frescoes however were soon damaged by dampness, and were completely destroyed by fire in December 1931. Jusélius assigned the artist's son Jorma to repaint them from the original sketches. The reconstruction was completed just before Jorma's death in 1939.)

Gallen-Kallela officially finnicized his name to the more Finnish-sounding Akseli Gallen-Kallela in 1907. His idea for a 700-page  was fully formed in 1909 with a publication of his plan in the Valvoja magazine.

Kenya

In 1908 with renewal in mind, Gallen-Kallela and his family moved to Paris. However the city and the new direction art was being taken didn't feel as hospitable as he had hoped, and so in May 1909 they moved much further away to Nairobi in Kenya. He was the first Finnish artist to paint south of the Sahara, and he totalled over 150 expressionistic works. Although artistically the paintings are of fluctuating quality, their colors and the synergy of the colors are remarkable. They returned to Finland in February 1911. Between 1911 and 1913 he designed and built a studio and house for his family at Tarvaspää, approximately 10 km northwest of the centre of Helsinki.

Finnish Civil War

The family moved back from Tarvaspää to Kalela in 1915 to escape the turmoil of WW I. A few years later in 1918, Gallen-Kallela and his son Jorma took part in the fighting at the front of the Finnish Civil War. When the regent, General Mannerheim, heard about this, he invited Gallen-Kallela to design the flags, official decorations and uniforms for the newly independent Finland. For the flag, Gallen-Kallela proposed a white-blue cross flag, with colors inverted (white cross on blue), but this was considered too similar to the Swedish flag and particularly the Greek flag of the time. In 1919 he was appointed aide-de-camp to Mannerheim. In 1920 he made an agreement with the publishing company WSOY for the eventual publication of Great Kalevala, with the less decorative Koru-Kalevala being published first in 1922.

Taos, New Mexico, and later life

In December 1923 he moved to the United States, where his family also followed him in autumn 1924. He first spent time in Chicago, and an exhibition of his work toured several cities. In Chicago he was impressed by Native American art and moved to Taos, New Mexico, at the art colony there to study it further. During this time in the United States he also began sketching out the Great Kalevala in much more detail. In May 1926, the family returned to Finland. Two years later in 1928 together with his son Jorma he painted the Kalevala frescoes at the lobby of the National Museum of Finland. Then in 1930 he made an agreement to paint a gigantic fresco for the bank Kansallis-Osake-Pankki, but on 7 March 1931 while returning from a lecture in Copenhagen he suddenly died of pneumonia in Stockholm.

Legacy
His studio and house at Tarvaspää was opened as the Gallen-Kallela Museum in 1961; it houses some of his works and research facilities on Gallen-Kallela himself.

See also

 Golden Age of Finnish Art
 Finnish art

Notes

References

Citations

Sources

Books

Websites

External links 

 List of all paintings by Gallen-Kallela on Commons
 Gallen-Kallela Museum website
 

1865 births
1931 deaths
Burials at Hietaniemi Cemetery
People from Pori
People from Turku and Pori Province (Grand Duchy of Finland)
Swedish-speaking Finns
People of the Finnish Civil War (White side)
Recipients of the Legion of Honour
Fresco painters
Finnish heraldists
Académie Julian alumni
20th-century Finnish painters
Finnish expatriates in Kenya
Finnish expatriates in France
Finnish expatriates in the United States
Finnish male painters
20th-century Finnish male artists